The NORCECA Girls Youth Continental Championship U-18 is a sport competition for national volleyball teams, currently held biannually and organized by the NORCECA, the North America, Central America and Caribbean volleyball federation. The competition is played by girls' under-18 teams.

Summary

Medal table

See also
Boys' Youth NORCECA Volleyball Championship

NORCECA Volleyball Championship
Women's NORCECA Volleyball Championship
V